The beach handball competition at the World Games 2009 took place from July 18 to July 20, at the Sizihwan in Kaohsiung, Taiwan.

Medal table

Medal summary

Men's tournament

Preliminary round

Group A

Group B

Knockout stage

Women's tournament

Preliminary round

Group A

Group B

Knockout stage

References

External links
 2009 World Games – Beach handball

2009 World Games
2009
World Games
2009 World Games